Climax (October 1974) is a compilation album by The Ohio Players and the first of two albums compiled from tracks left over from previous sessions recorded for the Detroit-based Westbound label.  The group was signed to Mercury by the time Climax hit stores, and the album features only five new songs (with the other three pulled from *previous albums).  Their Mercury debut, Skin Tight, was released several months earlier.

Along with six originals, the album includes cover versions of Creedence Clearwater Revival's "Proud Mary" and Marvin Gaye's "What's Going On", adding to the group's already growing repertoire.

Track listing

 "Sleep Talk" (Ohio Players) (3:15) [*previously issued]
 "Ruffell Foot" (Louis Crane, Belda Baine) (4:07)
 "Proud Mary" (John Fogerty) (5:21)
 "Climax"  (Crane, Baine) (6:50) 
 "What's Going On" (Marvin Gaye, Al Cleveland, Renaldo Benson) (6:00)
 "Food Stamps Y'All" (Crane, Baine) (2:28) [*previously issued]
 "Players Ballin'" (Ohio Players) (4:31) [*previously issued]
 "Pack It Up" (Crane, Baine) (4:20)

Trivia
 The S&M theme of their album covers continued, with the cover model from their first three Westbound covers embracing a man for the fourth. If one is to look at the back cover, it is revealed that the woman is stabbing the man in the back with a knife, with red wax to represent blood.
 The ending of "What's Going On" would inspire hip-hop producer Pete Rock to use it as a sample in "Lots of Lovin'", as recorded by Pete Rock & CL Smooth.
 The song Climax appears in the 2013 video game Grand Theft Auto V in the in-game radio station The Lowdown 91.1.

Charts

References

External links
 Climax at Discogs

1974 albums
Ohio Players albums
Westbound Records albums